The Portuguese Institute for Development Support (Portuguese: Instituto Português de Apoio ao Desenvolvimento, IPAD) is a development aid agency under the Portuguese Ministry for Foreign Affairs. Since January 2003, the institute is responsible for the coordination, supervision and direction of the Portuguese official development assistance to developing countries.

The institute focus on the Portuguese-speaking African countries (Angola, Cape Verde, Guinea-Bissau, Mozambique and São Tomé and Príncipe, known in Portuguese by the acronym PALOP) and East Timor. In 2009 these countries absorbed 66% of the bilateral aid disbursed by IPAD (131 million euros). The same year, the institute disbursed a total of approximately 368 million euros in bilateral and multilateral aid. According to the OECD, 2020 official development assistance from Portugal decreased 10.6% to USD 385 million.

In 2012, IPAD was merged with Camões Institute to form Camões - the Institute of Cooperation and Language (Camões I.P.).

References

External links

Camões I.P. website

Portugal, Portuguese Institute for Development Support
International Development Cooperation Agency